Bottenfjellet or Åsbygda is a village in Stange Municipality in Innlandet county, Norway.

Since 2016, the population and area data for this village area has not been separately tracked by Statistics Norway.

References

Stange
Villages in Innlandet